Billy Walsh (born October 7, 1972) is a former American soccer player and coach.

Walsh played high school soccer at Chatham High School. In 1999, he was named by The Star-Ledger as one of the top ten New Jersey high school soccer players of the 1990s.

Walsh played college soccer at the University of Virginia and Rutgers. In 1996, he was the only collegian on the U.S. team that competed in the Atlanta Olympics.

Walsh was drafted by the MetroStars of Major League Soccer in the second round of the 1998 MLS College Draft. He played four years for the club, mostly at defensive midfielder, and was named the team MVP in 1999. After the 2001 season, he was waived and spent 2002 with the Chicago Fire.

Walsh did receive his lone cap for the senior U.S. national team as a last-minute sub against Jamaica on September 8, 1999.

After ending his career as a player, Walsh coached his alma mater Chatham High School in Chatham Township, New Jersey, as well as Manhattan College.

References

1975 births
American soccer players
Chatham High School (New Jersey) alumni
Soccer players from New Jersey
Virginia Cavaliers men's soccer players
Rutgers Scarlet Knights men's soccer players
Major League Soccer players
New York Red Bulls players
Chicago Fire FC players
United States men's international soccer players
Olympic soccer players of the United States
Footballers at the 1996 Summer Olympics
American soccer coaches
People from Chatham Township, New Jersey
Sportspeople from Morris County, New Jersey
Living people
MLS Pro-40 players
A-League (1995–2004) players
New York Red Bulls draft picks
Association football midfielders
High school soccer coaches in the United States
Manhattan Jaspers soccer coaches
College men's soccer coaches in the United States